The U.S. Dance Club Songs chart is published weekly by Billboard. It compiles the weeks most popular songs from a sample of reporting DJ's around the country. The first number-one song of 2014 was "Unconditionally" by Katy Perry. With remixes by Syn Cole, Manufactured Superstars, Tracy Young and Country Club Martini Crew, it became her twelfth consecutive chart topper, extending her own record for the most number-ones in a row in the thirty-seven year history of the chart. Perry achieved a further three number one singles during the year – "Dark Horse" featuring Juicy J, "Birthday" and "This Is How We Do" – with the last becoming her record-extending fifteenth consecutive number-one. Beyoncé was one of three acts to top the chart three times, beginning with "Blow", then "Partition" and her twenty-second in total, "Pretty Hurts". Iggy Azalea and Dave Audé achieved three number-ones; the former with "Fancy" featuring Charli XCX, "Black Widow" featuring Rita Ora and "Booty", a collaboration with Jennifer Lopez, and Audé with "Take Me Away", "Aftermath (Here We Go)" and "Hustlin. Demi Lovato topped the chart twice with "Neon Lights" and "Really Don't Care" featuring Cher Lloyd. "Somebody Loves You" became Betty Who's first song to top the chart. Jennifer Lopez's hit streak of 11 number ones was broken with the release of "I Luh Ya Papi" but follow up with another number one "First Love" and her collaboration with Azalea.

Fedde Le Grand and Gregor Salto & Funkin Matt produced remixes of Mariah Carey's song "You're Mine (Eternal)", garnering the singer her seventeenth number-one since she first topped the chart with "Someday" in 1991. "Painkillr", by Erika Jayne, became her seventh consecutive number-one on the chart. In addition to "Black Widow", Ora's own "I Will Never Let You Down" topped the chart in June. Enrique Iglesias became the male artist with the most number-one songs in history, with "Bailando" featuring Descemer Bueno and Gente de Zona becoming his thirteenth. "Can't Remember to Forget You", a song by Shakira featuring Rihanna, became the former's sixth and the latter's twenty-second number-one in April, making Rihanna the second artist with the most entries after Madonna. Shakira also topped the chart with "Dare (La La La)" in July. Zhu's song "Faded" topped the chart on December 20. A writer for Complex was surprised that the song only reached number-one in December despite being commercially released in September, writing "While I'd love to say that it's because the song is just that damn good (which it is), Billboard says it's been helped by the number of remixes from Odesza, Amtrac, and The Magician." "Never Say Never" by Basement Jaxx became the most-played track of the year from the national sample, ranking atop the Dance Club Songs 2014 year-end chart.

List of number-ones

See also
Dance Club Songs
List of number-one dance hits (United States)
Artists with the most number-ones on the U.S. dance chart
List of artists who reached number one on the U.S. dance chart

References

External links
Current Dance Club Songs chart at Billboard
Dance Club Songs 2014 year-end chart at Billboard

United States Dance
2014
2014 in American music